Elvar Örn Jónsson (born 31 August 1997) is an Icelandic handball player for Skjern Håndbold and the Icelandic national team.

He represented Iceland at the 2019 World Men's Handball Championship.

References

External links

Skjern profile

1997 births
Living people
Elvar Örn Jónsson
UMF Selfoss handball players
Expatriate handball players
Icelandic expatriate sportspeople in Denmark